Hieracium robinsonii, or Robinson's hawkweed, is a North American plant species in the tribe Cichorieae within the family Asteraceae. It is native to eastern Canada and the northeastern United States (Québec, New Brunswick, Nova Scotia, Maine, and New Hampshire). There are reports of it formerly growing in Newfoundland, but it does not appear to grow there now.

One stalk can produce 1–10 flower heads in a flat-topped array. Each head has 30–50 yellow ray flowers but no disc flowers.

References

robinsonii
Flora of Canada
Flora of the Northeastern United States
Plants described in 1921
Flora without expected TNC conservation status